Nam Gwang-Hyun  (born 25 August 1987) is a South Korean footballer who currently plays for Daejeon Korea Hydro & Nuclear Power FC.

External links 

1987 births
Living people
South Korean footballers
South Korean expatriate footballers
Jeonnam Dragons players
Gangwon FC players
K League 1 players
Korea National League players
Expatriate footballers in Thailand
South Korean expatriate sportspeople in Thailand
Association football midfielders